Berka of Dubá was a cadet branch of a Bohemian noble family of Lords of Dubá established by Hynek Berka of Dubá (1249–1306). It held estates in what is today the Czech Republic and Saxony in Germany throughout the Middle Ages.

Domanial
Houska, Bělá pod Bezdězem, Bezděz, Lemberk, Dubá, Zákupy, Milštejn, Tolštejn, Kokořín, Kuřívody, Berštejn, Mühlberg (until the 15th century), Herrschaft Hohnstein (Saxony) – given in exchange for Mühlberg to the House of Wettin in 1443.

End of line
After the Battle of White Mountain on 8 November 1620, many of the members were expelled together with the King Frederick I and domanials were confiscated. One of the family members, loyal to the Emperor Ferdinand II, was created an Imperial Count in 1637. Line died off in the 18th century, some descendants of expellees after the Battle of White Mountain remained in Sweden and in Saxony during 18th and 19th centuries.

Notable members
Zbyněk Berka of Dubá, Archbishop of Prague in 1592–1606.

External links
Short History (in Czech)

Bohemian noble families